Mark Daly may refer to:

 Mark Daly (politician) (born 1973), Irish Fianna Fáil politician
 Mark Daly (actor) (1887–1957), British film actor
 Mark Daly (scientist) (born 1968), human geneticist

See also
Mark Daley, broadcaster